The ARIA Music Award for Best Original Soundtrack / Cast / Show Album is an award presented within the Fine Arts Awards at the annual ARIA Music Awards. The ARIA Awards recognise "the many achievements of Aussie artists across all music genres", and have been given by the Australian Recording Industry Association (ARIA) since 1987.

Original soundtrack albums and cast/show albums by solo artists, groups and various artist compilations are eligible. This includes recordings of existing or planned theatrical productions and soundtracks, scores and underscores for existing or planned film and television productions. Compilation soundtracks must contain over 50% of previously unreleased material by tracks and/or time and all artists must meet the artist eligibility criteria. It is judged by a specialist judging school of representatives experienced with the genre.

The ARIA Award for Best Original Soundtrack/Cast/Show Album has been awarded since the inaugural ARIA Awards in 1987, and was originally named Best Australian Original Soundtrack or Cast Recording. Between 1999 and 2003, separate awards were given for Best Original Soundtrack Album and Best Original Show/Cast Album.

Winners and nominees
In the following table, the winner is highlighted in a separate colour and in boldface; the nominees are those that are not highlighted or in boldface. Nominees in 1988 are not available in published sources.

References

External links
The ARIA Awards Official website

O
A